The 2016–17 BBL season was the 30th campaign of the British Basketball League since the league's establishment in 1987. The season featured 12 teams from across England and Scotland. The season started on September 23, 2016, and ended on May 14, 2017.

Apparel

As of the 2016/17 BBL season Italian sportswear manufacturer Kappa was the kit supplier for all the 12 teams.

Teams

Notable occurrences
Cheshire Phoenix announced former player Colin O'Reilly as their new head coach. After an unsuccessful start to the season, O'Reilly left the club after just 14 competitive matches. After weeks of searching for a replacement, he was replaced by Cheshire legend Robbie Peers, who himself only lasted a few games before personal reasons forced him to step down. Assistant coach Ben Thomas took the reins for the remainder of the season.
Sheffield Sharks head coach Atiba Lyons sparked controversy after the signing of three players from a combine for prospective players he held in the United States. Forward Marquis Mathis didn't play a single game for the club, before signing for English Basketball League side Solent Kestrels, and forward Shaheed Davis lasted only 4 competitive matches. Only point guard Jordan Davis, who had previous professional experience, lasted the season, which was spent mostly on the sidelines due to injury. 
Glasgow Rocks brought in a new assistant coach in the form of Scotland national team coach Erik Olson.
In a major coup for the club Glasgow Rocks signed championship-winning point guard Neil Watson from the Leicester Riders.
Newcastle Eagles were to begin a rebuilding process after losing Andrew Thomson to rivals Leicester and club stalwart Charles Smith to retirement at the end of the 2015–16 season. The club signed Orlan Jackman from rivals Worcester Wolves, Deondre Parks from South Dakota State and GB international Joe Hart.
On the eve of the new season, Leicester Riders signed former Cheshire standout Taylor King, who became available after leaving Lithuanian side Nevėžis. American rookie Donovan Jack was cut without making an appearance for the club to make space on the roster for King.
The league announced a broadcast deal with BBC Sport to show up to 32 games live via the BBC Red Button and BBC Sport website. The first game shown was Worcester Wolves' thrashing of local rivals Bristol Flyers 88–56. The result would kickstart the Flyers' season, who won 7 of their next 8 league matches. 
Glasgow Rocks set a franchise record of 12 consecutive wins during October, November and December. 
Worcester Wolves brought in influential big man Maurice Walker after a spell with Valmiera in Latvia. Walker would prove to be a catalyst in kickstarting the Wolves' faltering campaign. The club would go on to win 15 of their next 18 league games after his arrival in November.
Newcastle Eagles won the BBL Cup, defeating the Glasgow Rocks 91–83 in the final at the Barclaycard Arena, Birmingham.
Manchester Giants became only the third BBL side to have lost a competitive match to a non-BBL team, crashing out of the BBL Trophy 1st Round following an 86–84 away defeat to Essex Leopards. Former BBL player Mike Martin put in a standout performance with 41 points for the Leopards.
Scottish National League sideBoroughmuir Blaze competed in the BBL Trophy for the first time, losing 74–108 at home to the visiting Plymouth Raiders.
Manchester Giants announced they had received the appropriate UK Home Office documentation to allow them to sign work permit players in the future.
Leicester Riders won the BBL Trophy, thrashing Plymouth Raiders 91–58 in the final at the Emirates Arena in Glasgow.
On the eve of the final weekend of the regular season, Plymouth Raiders announced they had been forced to release star forward Anton Grady for a "serious breach of club and league rules". Although the club declined to comment on the exact nature of the breach, it was reported by British basketball media outlet MVP to be due to a failed drugs test taken after the Raiders' Trophy final defeat in March.
Plymouth Raiders, despite their healthy playing budget and star studded roster, failed to reach the post season playoffs for the fourth consecutive year.
Surrey Scorchers reached the post season Playoffs for the first time under their new guise at the second attempt. Finishing 8th with a 15–18 record, the club were drawn against champions Leicester. After a buzzer beating 3 from Gabriel McCray earned the Guildford-based club a rare 73–73 draw in the 1st leg, the Scorchers were comfortably beaten in the return leg at the Leicester Arena. 
Towards the end of the season it was announced that long term Rocks owner and founder Ian Reid had sold his shares in the club to businessman Duncan Smillie, although staying on at the club as non-executive chairman. 
At the end of the season, Glasgow Rocks announced that head coach Sterling Davis would be leaving the club, bringing to an end his 11-year association with the club as a player, player-coach and head coach.
At the end of the season, Manchester Giants announced that head coach Yorick Williams would not coach the team for the following season after two years at the helm, instead taking on an ambassadorial role within the club. Former assistant coach and Giants' development team head coach Danny Byrne was soon announced as his replacement.
Despite one year remaining of a two-year contract, Plymouth Raiders announced Jonathan White would not be returning to the club as head coach. BBC Spotlight revealed concerns raised by Raiders' fans of the authenticity of White's original appointment, namely his claimed experience of coaching in the National Basketball League (Australia). Despite numerous requests for interviews, Spotlight were shut out by White and the club.

BBL Championship

Regular season

Standings

Playoffs

Bracket

Final

Statistics
minimum of 25 games played

Source:

BBL Cup

1st Round

Quarter-finals

Semi-finals

Final

BBL Trophy

1st Round

Quarter-finals

Semi-finals

Final

Awards

Monthly awards

Season Awards

 BBL Cup MVP: Rahmon Fletcher, Newcastle Eagles
 BBL Trophy MVP: Taylor King, Leicester Riders
 Finals MVP: Pierre Hampton, Leicester Riders
 Player of the year: Rahmon Fletcher, Newcastle Eagles
 Coach of the Year: Rob Paternostro, Leicester Riders
 Molten BBL Team of the year:
 Kieron Achara – Glasgow Rocks
 Maurice Walker – Worcester Wolves
 Rashad Hassan – London Lions
 Taylor King – Leicester Riders
 Rahmon Fletcher – Newcastle Eagles
 Molten BBL All-British Team of the year:
 Kieron Achara – Glasgow Rocks
 Orlan Jackman – Newcastle Eagles
 Garreth Murray – Glasgow Rocks
 Callum Jones – Manchester Giants
 Conner Washington – Leicester Riders
 Molten BBL All-Defensive Team of the year:
 Kieron Achara – Glasgow Rocks
 Scott Martin – Newcastle Eagles
 Jermel Kennedy – Worcester Wolves
 Zaire Taylor – London Lions
 Conner Washington – Leicester Riders

References

External links

British Basketball League seasons
1
British